Borislav Cvetković (born 30 September 1962) is a Serbian football manager and retired player. He was nicknamed "Lane sa Korane" (Doe of Korana), by legendary sports commentator Ivan Tomić, while playing for Dinamo. When he moved to Belgrade, Tomić just switched his nickname to "Lane sa Marakane" (Doe of Marakana), as Red Star Belgrade stadium is colloquially known.

Playing career

Club
During his club career he played for Dinamo Zagreb, Red Star Belgrade, Ascoli, Maceratese, Casertana and Borac Čačak.

International
He made his debut for Yugoslavia in a June 1983 friendly match against Romania, coming on as a 30th-minute substitute for Miloš Šestić, and earned a total of 11 caps, scoring 1 goal. He participated in UEFA Euro 1984. His final international was a November 1988 World Cup qualification match against France.

Coaching career
Cvetković coached FK Sopot, an expositure of Cvetković's former club Red Star Belgrade. He also coached Obilić in one short term, he worked also as assistant to Dragan Okuka in the Serbia U21 side.

Personal life
Boro is the younger brother of the late Zvjezdan Cvetković, who was the coach of Borac Banja Luka.

References

External links
 
 

1962 births
Living people
Sportspeople from Karlovac
Serbs of Croatia
Association football wingers
Association football forwards
Yugoslav footballers
Yugoslavia international footballers
Croatian footballers
Serbia and Montenegro footballers
Olympic footballers of Yugoslavia
Footballers at the 1984 Summer Olympics
Olympic bronze medalists for Yugoslavia
Medalists at the 1984 Summer Olympics
Olympic medalists in football
UEFA Euro 1984 players
GNK Dinamo Zagreb players
Red Star Belgrade footballers
Ascoli Calcio 1898 F.C. players
S.S. Maceratese 1922 players
Casertana F.C. players
FK Borac Čačak players
Yugoslav First League players
Serie A players
Serie B players
Serie D players
First League of Serbia and Montenegro players
Yugoslav expatriate footballers
Croatian expatriate footballers
Serbia and Montenegro expatriate footballers
Expatriate footballers in Italy
Yugoslav expatriate sportspeople in Italy
Serbia and Montenegro expatriate sportspeople in Italy
UEFA Champions League top scorers
Croatian football managers
Serbia and Montenegro football managers
FK Obilić managers
Red Star Belgrade non-playing staff